The Omati River is a river in southern Papua New Guinea.

See also
List of rivers of Papua New Guinea
Omati language
Omati River languages

References

Rivers of Papua New Guinea